The Radio Dances is an album by the artist Snailhouse. It was released in 1998 on Rhythm of Sickness Records, and distributed by Scratch Records.

Track listing
Have A Good Time
Plans
Look What I've Done
Accidental Seabirds
California Is Always Waiting
The Gluepot
In Case Of Fire
Shipwreck On The Passenger Side
All That Will Change
Making Light
Frost In The Headphones

References

Snailhouse albums
1998 albums